Naltar ski resort is a ski resort situated in the Karakoram range of the Naltar Valley in Gilgit-Baltistan province, Pakistan at a top elevation of . The resort is located, 40 kilometers northwest of Gilgit. It also serves as the main facility for the Ski Federation of Pakistan and the Pakistan National Ski Championship. It also hosted the 2016 Karakoram Alpine Ski Cup.

Facilities
Naltar is the oldest ski resort in Pakistan, however is relatively less known and less developed than Malam Jabba ski resort. The major obstacle to Naltar’s development has been the dilapidated condition of the road leading from Gilgit to Naltar. As things stand, the one-hour journey to Naltar is near impossible unless ski enthusiasts travel there by 4 wheel jeep. In 2015, a chairlift was constructed and work on rebuilding the Gilgit-Naltar Road has been proposed.

See also
 Malam Jabba ski resort
 Ski Federation of Pakistan

References

Ski areas and resorts in Pakistan
Buildings and structures in Gilgit-Baltistan
Tourist attractions in Gilgit-Baltistan